Cobark River, a perennial river of the Manning River catchment, is located in the Upper Hunter district of New South Wales, Australia.

Course and features
Cobark River rises in the Barrington Tops within the Great Dividing Range, near Thunderbolts Lookout in the Barrington Tops National Park, and flows generally east by south, joined by the Dilgry River before reaching its confluence with the Barrington River, south southwest of the village of Upper Bowman. The river descends  over its  course.

See also 

 Rivers of New South Wales
 List of rivers of New South Wales (A–K)
 List of rivers of Australia

References

 

Rivers of New South Wales
Rivers of the Hunter Region
Mid-Coast Council